Avanti Air GmbH & Co. KG, styled as avantiair, is a small German airline based in Burbach with a maintenance base at Siegerland Airport, operating ad hoc charter and aircraft wet-lease services.

History

Avanti Air (named after the Italian word for ahead) started operations on 1 July 1994. It was founded by former pilots Markus Baumann (now Managing Director) and Stefan Kissinger (now Chief Executive) as an aircraft management company. It entered the charter market in 1996 with two Raytheon Beech 1900C aircraft.

As of 2007, the company was owned by Gerhard Mahler (33,33%), Markus Baumann (33,33%) and Stefan Kissinger (33,33%) and had 73 employees.

In autumn 2014, Avanti Air introduced the Fokker 100 to its charter fleet alongside a new corporate design. In November 2015, the airline phased out their last ATR72 aircraft in favour of a second Fokker 100 and therefore becoming an all-jet operator. However, in October 2021 the airline exchanged their Fokker 100s for a sole De Havilland Canada Dash 8.

Destinations
Avanti Air offers charter and wetlease operations on long- and short-term basis to other airlines and tour operators as well as ad hoc charter services, e. g. for VIPs.

Fleet
The Avanti Air fleet consists of the following aircraft (as of May 2022):

Accidents and incidents
 On 19 February 1999 on 21:48 local time, an Avanti Air Beechcraft 1900D on a ferry flight from Düsseldorf to Frankfurt without any passengers on board was substantially damaged when the two pilots attempted to land at Frankfurt Airport even though the landing gear was still retracted by accident.

References

External links

Official website

Airlines of Germany
Companies based in North Rhine-Westphalia
European Regions Airline Association
Airlines established in 1994
1994 establishments in Germany